Lake Bridgeport is a city in Wise County, Texas, United States. The population was 339 in 2020.

Geography

Lake Bridgeport is located at  (33.207240, –97.830997). According to the United States Census Bureau, the city has a total area of 0.5 square miles (1.2 km2), all of it land.

The climate in this area is characterized by hot, humid summers and generally mild to cool winters.  According to the Köppen Climate Classification system, Lake Bridgeport has a humid subtropical climate, abbreviated "Cfa" on climate maps.

Demographics

As of the 2020 United States census, there were 339 people, 128 households, and 83 families residing in the city.

Education
The city of Lake Bridgeport is served by the Bridgeport Independent School District.

References

Cities in Texas
Cities in Wise County, Texas
Dallas–Fort Worth metroplex